The Canoeing competition at the 2010 Central American and Caribbean Games was being held in Mayagüez, Puerto Rico. 

The tournament was scheduled to be held from 20–21 July at the Lake Cerrillos in Ponce.

Medal summary

Men's events

Women's events

External links

Events at the 2010 Central American and Caribbean Games
July 2010 sports events in North America
Central American and Caribbean Games
2010